Alison aka Excuse Me, is the second album by Australian pop, soul, rock and blues singer Alison MacCallum, released in 1975.

Track listing
 "Hot Burrito" (Gram Parsons) – 3:49
 "Fade In, Fade Out" (Simon Napier-Bell) – 2:50
 "Hear My Voice On the Radio" (Sidney Jordan) – 3:09
 "Cry For Me" (Harry Vanda/George Young) – 4:08
 "See What You Can Do" (Simon Napier-Bell) – 2:42
 "Like a Child" (Simon Napier-Bell/Antonio Morales/Larry Ashmore) – 3:41
 "If Your Eyes Could Smile" (Simon Napier-Bell/A.Ryanto) – 4:01
 "Things To Do" (Harry Vanda/George Young)) – 3:07
 "Then" (Simon Napier-Bell/Antonio Morales) – 3:09
 "Excuse Me" (Simon Napier-Bell/Antonio Morales) – 3:09

Known Personnel
Alison MacCallum: Vocals, Backing Vocals.
Bobbi Marchini: Backing Vocals.
Janice Slater: Backing Vocals.

References 

1975 albums
Alison MacCallum albums